Esther Kaplan is an investigative journalist and deputy editor for investigations at Insider, and she has previously worked at The Center for Investigative Reporting, Village Voice, and The Nation,  In radio she's worked for WBAI. Her work has been published in Poz and Harper's Magazine. She is the author of the book With God on Their Side George W. Bush and the Christian Right. She graduated from Yale University.

References

American investigative journalists
Year of birth missing (living people)
Living people